Phil Gascoine (8 June 1934 – August 2007) was a British comics artist, best known for his work in comics such as Jinty, Bunty, and Battle Action, for which he drew The Sarge.

Biography
On leaving school at the age of 15, Phil Gascoine worked in various London art studios until leaving to do his National Service. On his return, his first comic book work was on a series of pocket-sized comics based on TV medical drama Emergency Ward Ten.

His comics career covered 45 years of work on varied titles as a freelancer, in the British, American, and European comics markets.

He died in August 2007 after a short illness.

Partial bibliography
For a more complete list of credits, see Downthetubes.net.

IPC
Battle Action
 The Sarge
 Sailor Sam
 The Wilde Bunch
 The News Team
Jinty
 No Cheers for Cherry
 Badgered Belinda

DC Thomson
Commando

Other
Look-in
 Knight Rider
 Robin of Sherwood
Wendy

Marvel
Punisher
Knights of Pendragon
Genetix

DC Comics
The Unknown Soldier (1988–1989)
Shade, the Changing Man

Notes

References

Phil Gascoine at the Lambiek Comiclopedia

External links
Memories of Phil Gascoine by David Lloyd
Phil Gascoine R.I.P by D'Israeli

1934 births
2007 deaths
British comics artists
Fleetway and IPC Comics creators